Major Sir David Hughes-Morgan, 1st Baronet (born David Hughes Morgan; 16 August 1871 – 16 March 1941) was a Welsh solicitor and landowner.

Hughes Morgan was born in Llandovery, Carmarthenshire. He was educated at Queen's College, Oxford and qualified as a solicitor, becoming a junior partner with Riddell, Vaizey and Smith in London.

After inheriting the estates of his uncle, Colonel John Morgan of Brecon, he retired from the law and returned home to Wales to administer them. He was High Sheriff of Breconshire for 1899 and mayor of Tenby eight times, and for this he was knighted in the 1920 New Year Honours and created a Baronet in the 1925 Birthday Honours. He also unsuccessfully contested Tenby Boroughs as a Conservative.

He was commissioned into the 3rd (Militia) Battalion, South Wales Borderers in 1891, and was promoted lieutenant in 1893 and captain in 1907. During the Boer War he commanded a prisoner of war camp in Ireland. He resigned his commission in 1906, but in 1907 joined the 1st (Volunteer) Battalion (later the Brecknockshire Battalion), resigning in 1911. During the First World War he returned to his regiment to command a musketry training camp in Pembrokeshire, retiring with the rank of major.

He changed his surname to the hyphenated Hughes-Morgan by deed poll in 1925.

Footnotes

References
Obituary, The Times, 18 March 1941

1871 births
1941 deaths
Alumni of The Queen's College, Oxford
Welsh solicitors
Mayors of places in Wales
Knights Bachelor
Baronets in the Baronetage of the United Kingdom
British Militia officers
South Wales Borderers officers
British Army personnel of the Second Boer War
British Army personnel of World War I
People from Llandovery
Welsh cricketers
Carmarthenshire cricketers
High Sheriffs of Brecknockshire
Conservative Party (UK) parliamentary candidates